Tirana Hassan is an Australian lawyer, social worker, and human rights activist. She is the executive director (acting) of Human Rights Watch, an international non-governmental organization based in New York City.

Early life and education 
Hassan was born in Singapore to a Pakistani father Riaz Hassan, who is an Australian academic, and a Malaysian-born Sri Lankan and Chinese mother Selva Arulamapalam, a dentist. Her childhood was spent in Singapore, Indonesia, the United States, and Australia. She attended high school at Scotch College in Australia and holds bachelor's degrees with honors in social work from the University of South Australia, and law from the University of Adelaide. In 2008, she received a master’s of studies in human rights law from Oxford University.

While in her final year of law school, Hassan co-founded the Woomera Lawyers Group, a refugee advocacy organization that provided legal services to asylum seekers detained in Australia. She was based part-time at the Woomera Detention Centre.

Career 
In August 2022, Hassan became the acting executive director for Human Rights Watch after Kenneth Roth retired from the role. Before taking the position, Hassan worked as the deputy executive director and chief programs officer, overseeing the organization's research, legal and policy, communications, and advocacy departments.

From 2010 to 2015, Hassan was a senior researcher in Human Rights Watch’s Emergencies Division, responsible for human rights investigations in the Middle East, Asia, and Africa. In 2011 while conducting a research mission in Indonesia, Hassan was detained with fellow HRW researcher Andreas Harsono while investigating persecution and violence in the East Java region.

As a researcher, Hassan published reports on violence against women in Cote d’Ivoire and Somalia, uprisings in Egypt in Bahrain, the Red Shirts political movement in Thailand, armed conflict in Libya, Sudan and South Sudan, child recruitment and attacks on schools in Somalia, sectarian violence in Burma and armed conflict in Iraq.

Amnesty International

From 2015 to 2020, Hassan was director of Amnesty International’s crisis response program, leading teams of investigators and building the organization's capacity in innovative research methodology, including using digital verification research methods for evidence collection in partnerships.

During her time at Amnesty, Hassan worked on crises in Yemen, Syria, and European refugee issues. She covered the 2015 Rohingya refugee crisis, when tens of thousands of Rohingya people were forcibly displaced from their villages and IDP camps in Rakhine State, Myanmar by the Myanmar security forces.

Other Work
Prior to attending law school, Hassan was a social worker in Los Angeles, California, London, United Kingdom, and Adelaide, Australia.

From 2003-2010, Hassan worked in humanitarian aid operations as a protection specialist focusing on children in armed conflict, sexual and gender-based violence programs, and humanitarian protection across Asia and Africa. She has worked with  Médecins Sans Frontières (MSF), the United Nations International Children's Emergency Fund (UNICEF), and was Save the Children’s child protection program director for West Africa.

References 

Australian women activists
Human rights activists
Women human rights activists
Human Rights Watch people
Year of birth missing (living people)
University of South Australia alumni
University of Adelaide alumni
Alumni of the University of Oxford
Living people